This article includes railway colleges/universities/higher-educational-institutes in the Russian empire, the Soviet Union, and the Post-Soviet states (which includes the Russian Federation).

Railway colleges are higher educational institutes which train students for railway careers, mainly in engineering.  They differ from other colleges by offering various classes on railway topics (such as Railway electrification, railway operations, etc.) and most students major in some railway specialty.  The Soviet Union inherited a few such colleges from the Russian empire and both expanded them and created many new railway colleges.  After the demise of the Soviet Union and the resulting decline in railway transportation in the Post-Soviet states, most of these colleges (often renamed as a "university") continued to operate with government support.

Introduction
Railway colleges during the Soviet era prepared students for careers in various aspects of railroading, primarily as engineers. During the Soviet period they were often known as "higher educational institutes" (for railways) or vuz (вуз , (an acronym ), and this designation is still in use. In 1967 (Soviet period) they had a total of 215,000 students enrolled, about half of which were correspondence students. However, less than 7000 students graduated each year, mostly in engineering (such as electrical, mechanical, or civil engineering with emphasis on railway applications).

Almost 10 years later (in 1976) they had a total of 130 thousand students: 50k daytime students, 12k nite school students, and 52k correspondence students.  There were 21 different fields of study including 3 new ones: computer science, applied mathematics, and automatic control systems.  During the 9th 5-year plan (1970-1975) they graduated 66 thousand engineers (a little over 12 thousand per years) which is more than reported for the 1960s per above.  In 1976 there were then a total of 15 institutes and 86 Tekhnikums.

Today (2015), about 25 years after the demise of the Soviet Union that founded many of these colleges, railway universities are still quite active but the mission statements of the two largest ones don't even mention "railways".  Instead, they imply their major mission is "transportation" which, of course, includes railways.  Two major railway universities in 2015 are in St. Petersburg and Moscow.

The Moscow "University" claims to be the 5th largest university in the world in terms of the number of students (about 60,000).
 This excludes correspondence students but might include students in the over 40 branches of the university in other cities and also might include students in the tekhnikum that merged into the university. However, only "17,000 undergraduate and postgraduate students" are claimed on the English part of the official university website:

Railway vocational schools
Besides railway colleges/universities, there were railway tekhnikums.  These were schools which were mid-level educational institutions somewhat below the college level.  They are often known as "colleges" in Russia today  There was also a somewhat lower level of railway school known as a railway uchilishche  or ПУ = PU for short.  Graduates of these two types of schools were qualified to become technicians, maintaining and repairing railway equipment and track, etc.  Some became locomotive drivers along with some graduates of railway colleges.

Lists of railway colleges; websites
The first two links in a line for a college are: 1. web-article in the Russian Wikipedia (ru wiki) 2. the college "official (web)site".  Many of the college sites are either in Russian or have a Russian version of the site.  Even if you can't read Russian, there are pictures to look at. Some sites have an English version which is usually quite incomplete.  The date at the end of each entry is the founding date of the college. Today's college (university) names have been much changed since the Soviet era.

Post Soviet railway colleges currently inside the Russian Federation
In the abbreviated university names shown below, such as ПГУПС, "ГУПС"="Государственный Университет Путей Сообщения" = "Government University of Railways" = "State University of Railways".  The leading П in ПГУПС stands for Петербургский = Petersburg, the city where the university is located.  Both the Petersburg and Moscow websites have some info in English.
 Petersburg State University of Railways of Emperor Alexander I (ПГУПС, was ЛИИЖТ)(ru wiki) official site(en stub wiki) located in St. Petersburg 1810 
 Russian University of Transportation (РУТ). Was Moscow State University of Railways (МИИТ=MIIT=МГУПС) (ru wiki) official site (en stub wiki) See also  located in Moscow 1896 
 Samara State University Railways (СамГУПС)(ru wiki)  official site located in Samara 1973
 Omsk State University of Railways (ОмГУПС)(ru wiki)  official site Info in English located in Omsk 1900
 Rostov State University of Railways (РГУПС)(ru wiki)  official site  located in Rostov-on-Don 1927
 Far East State University of Railways (ДВГУПС) (ru wiki)  official site   located in Khabarovsk 1939
 Irkutsk State University of Railways (ИрГУПС)(wiki)  official site  located in Irkutsk 1975
 Siberian State University of Railways (СГУПС) (ru wiki)  official site located in Novosibirsk 1932
 Ural State University of Railways (УрГУПС = USURT)(ru wiki) official site (en wiki stub) located in Sverdlovsk 1956
 Russian Open Academy of Transportation (РОАТ)(ru wiki)  official site  headquarters in Moscow 1951
(The "Open Academy" is a correspondence school and is part of the Russian University of Transportation (РУТ) 
The above universities often have branches in other cities. Railway trade schools, a "tekhnikum"="техникум", been taken in under the university umbrella and are now classified as branches of railway universities. The above websites often include pictures of campuses, students, etc. For full access to the websites (which includes class assignments, etc.) one usually needs an account (including password) which only the students, etc. may obtain.
Russians today seem to be highly motivated to obtain a college education, even if the job prospects are not very good. It was thought by some that under capitalism, there would not be the surplus of college graduates that existed in the USSR. But it turns out that there is an even greater surplus today.

Branches of the above railway colleges (incomplete)) 
The following is for 2015.  Not all of these organizations were branches during the Soviet period.
Branches of Irkutsk Railway University  (ИрГУПС) Translations for list below:  "ЖЕЛЕЗНОДОРОЖНОГО ТРАНСПОРТА"="Railway Transportation"   ИНСТИТУТ=Institute ТЕХНИКУМ=Tekhnikum ФИЛИАЛ=Branch
"КРАСНОЯРСКИЙ (Krasnoyarsk)ИНСТИТУТ ЖЕЛЕЗНОДОРОЖНОГО ТРАНСПОРТА" = "КРАСНОЯРСКИЙ (Krasnoyarsk) ФИЛИАЛ ИрГУПС"
"КРАСНОЯРСКИЙ (Krasnoyarsk) ТЕХНИКУМ ЖЕЛЕЗНОДОРОЖНОГО ТРАНСПОРТА" = "КРАСНОЯРСКОГО (Krasnoyarsk)ИНСТИТУТА ЖЕЛЕЗНОДОРОЖНОГО ТРАНСПОРТА" (tekhnikum)
"УЛАН-УДЭНСКИЙ (Ulan-Ude) ИНСТИТУТ ЖЕЛЕЗНОДОРОЖНОГО ТРАНСПОРТА" = "УЛАН-УДЭНСКИЙ (Ulan-Ude) ФИЛИАЛ ИрГУПС"
"УЛАН-УДЭНСКИЙ (Ulan-Ude) КОЛЛЕДЖ (College) ЖЕЛЕЗНОДОРОЖНОГО ТРАНСПОРТА" = "УЛАН-УДЭНСКОГО (Ulan-Ude) ИНСТИТУТА ЖЕЛЕЗНОДОРОЖНОГО ТРАНСПОРТА"
"ЗАБАЙКАЛЬСКИЙ (Trans-Baikal) ИНСТИТУТ ЖЕЛЕЗНОДОРОЖНОГО ТРАНСПОРТА" = "ЧИТИНСКИЙ Chita ФИЛИАЛ ИрГУПС"
"ЧИТИНСКИЙ Chita ТЕХНИКУМ ЖЕЛЕЗНОДОРОЖНОГО ТРАНСПОРТА" = "ЗАБАЙКАЛЬСКОГО (Trans-Baikal) ТЕХНИКУМ ЖЕЛЕЗНОДОРОЖНОГО ТРАНСПОРТА" (Tekhnikum)
СЕВЕРОБАЙКАЛЬСКИЙ (Severobaikalsk) 2015: Defunct
БРАТСКИЙ (Bratsk) ФИЛИАЛ ИрГУПС
МЕДИЦИНСКИЙ КОЛЛЕДЖ (Medical College) ЖЕЛЕЗНОДОРОЖНОГО ТРАНСПОРТА
Улан-Баторский (Ulan-Bator) филиал ИрГУПС Mongolia
Branches of Moscow State University of Railway Engineering, (MIIT=МИИТ=МГУПС) Russian wiki  ("филиал МИИТ"="branch of MIIT")
Белгородский филиал МИИТ  Belgorod
 Брянский филиал МИИТ Bryansk
Волгоградский филиал МИИТ Volgograd
Воронежский филиал МИИТ Voronezh
Елецкий филиал МИИТ Yelets
Казанский филиал МИИТ Kazan
Калининградский филиал МИИТ Kaliningrad
Калужский филиал МИИТ Kaluga
Кировский филиал МИИТ Kirov]
Курский железнодорожный техникум - филиал МИИТ Kursk (Tekhnikum}
Лискинский филиал МИИТ Liski
Муромский филиал МИИТ Murom
Нижегородский филиал МИИТ Nizhny Novgorod
Ожерельевский железнодорожный колледж - филиал МИИТ  Ozherele (formerly a Tekhnikum ) 
Орловский филиал МИИТ Orel
Поволжский филиал МИИТ Saratov
Рославльский железнодорожный техникум - филиал МИИТ Roslavl (Tekhnikum}
Представительство МИИТ в г. Ртищево Rtishchevo
Рязанский филиал МИИТ Ryazan
Смоленский филиал МИИТ Smolensk
Тамбовский железнодорожный техникум - филиал МИИТ Tambov (Tekhnikum}
Тульский филиал МИИТ Tyla
железнодорожный техникум - филиал МИИТ Uzlovaya (Tekhnikum}
ШУРС - филиал МИИТ Pushkino (Not a college; claims to be a school for improving supervision)
Ярославский филиал МИИТ Yaroslav
Представительство МИИТ в г. Лабытнанги Labytnangi

Post-Soviet railway colleges currently outside of the Russian Federation
These are found today in the Post-Soviet states outside of the Russian Federation.  The last two were founded in 1992 after the collapse of the Soviet Union.
 Belarus national institute of transportation (ru wiki)(БелГУТ   = БелДУТ  )Official site in Gomel, Belarus 1953 
Dnepropetrovsk national university of railway transport(ДИИТ) (ru wiki)  . Official site   in Dnepropetrovsk, Ukraine 1930
 Donetsk railway transport institute (ДонИЖТ) (ru wiki) Official site in Donetsk, Ukraine 1967 
 Ukraine national academy of railway transportation (ru wiki) (УкрГАЖТ  = УкрДАЗТ )  Official site in Kharkiv=Kharkov, Ukraine 1930
 Tashkent institute of railway transport engineering (ТашИИТ) (ru wiki) official site:  in Tashkent, Uzbekistan 1931
 Kazakhstan academy of transport and communications named M. Tynyshpaev (КазАТК)(ru wiki)  (some info in ). Official site:  in Alma-ata=Almaty, Kazakhstan 1976
 Turkmen state institute of transport and communications (ТГИТис) (ru wiki)  wiki Official site  in Ashgabat, Turkmenistan 1992
 Institute of railway transport (Latvia) (DzTI) 1992 (ru wiki) ) Now integrated into the Faculty of Transport and Mechanical Engineering  of Riga Technical University. The predecessor of this institute was a branch (since 1965) of the Soviet Leningrad institute of railway engineering and served the 3 Baltic states plus the Kaliningrad region.  In Riga, Latvia

Textbooks for railway courses
A large number of titles of railway textbooks were published in the USSR.  Examples of subjects covered are railway track, cars, locomotives, signalling and communications (including remote control and automation),  transport economics, accounting, etc.  Many such textbooks included mathematical formulas (and some had differential equations).   Every year saw several new such textbooks (or revised editions of existing textbooks). Railway textbooks were also published for use by #Railway vocational schools.

Comparison with the United States
There is no comparison of railway colleges in the Soviet Union with the United States since there were no railways colleges in the United States.  However, the [US] once had railway University courses in Civil Engineering and there was a failed attempt at Harvard Business School to create a cadet-system of railway education in the 1920s.

After World War II the University of Illinois was the only major institution in the US providing instruction in railway engineering (in the Civil Engineering Dept.).  After professor W.W. Hay retired from teaching railway engineering there, his position was not replaced and the railway courses were thus abolished.  However, in the 1990s the University of Illinois restarted its railway engineering program and has the US' most robust railroad engineering and research program.  A few other American universities, notably Michigan Tech and Purdue offer railroad engineering classes.

At Harvard Business School there were great expectations for the "cadet" program but the railroads failed to support it and the graduates from the program obtained positions in other industries.  One observer of the railroad's attitude towards education stated that railway senior officials were the result of producing "the 'practical man' who had little use for anything learned in school".  Wyckoff's book states (regarding the railroad's "Attitudes toward formal education") that "There was even evidence that the educated man was put upon and ridiculed by other middle managers and workers."  Thus the railroads themselves appear to be at least partly responsible for the lack of college level railway education in the US.

References

Books
Wyckoff, D. Daryl, "Railroad Management" Lexington Books 1976.

Magazines
ЖД Транс = Железносоеожный транспорт  (Railway transport). Moscow (monthly)

Notes

Vocational education in the Soviet Union